Leta may refer to:
 LETA, a Latvian news agency

See also 
 Leto, in Greek mythology, a daughter of the Titans Coeus and Phoebe
 Lake Letas, the largest lake in Vanuatu